Ignatius Abraham bar Gharib was the Syriac Orthodox Patriarch of Mardin from 1381 or 1382 until his death in 1412.

Biography
Abraham was the son of Quryaqos, son of Gharīb of Amid, and had a brother named Joseph, who would later become metropolitan bishop of Amid. He became a monk at the monastery of Saint Ananias and was ordained as a priest before 1355. Abraham was elected as patriarch of Mardin at a synod at Amid in 1381 or 1382, upon which he assumed the name Ignatius.

Soon after his ascension to the patriarchal office, Abraham designated a brother as his successor as patriarch, according to the anonymous continuator of the Ecclesiastical History of Bar Hebraeus. In doing so, he attempted to establish his own familial succession in imitation of the preceding patriarchs of Mardin, Ignatius Shahab and Ignatius Ismail, both of whom were nephews of their predecessor. This was unsuccessful, however, as Abraham's brother would predecease him.

In 1396, Timur's attack on Mardin resulted in damage to the nearby monastery of Saint Ananias, including the destruction of the wall, cells, and door of the sanctuary. Abraham promptly set about raising funds to restore the monastery through gathering donations and the sale of the monastery's furniture, manuscripts, and vessels. Eventually, he spent 50,000 coins of an unknown currency on rebuilding the monastery, at which time he may have also transferred the relics of Saint Eugene and others there. Abraham served as patriarch of Mardin until his death in 1412 and was buried in the mausoleum of the monastery of Saint Ananias.

Works
Abraham wrote a book of propitiatory prayers for the morning service of Lazarus Saturday, and compiled a liturgy of anaphoras of Church Fathers, including a 13-page anaphora written by his brother Joseph.

References
Notes

Citations

Bibliography

1412 deaths
Patriarchs of Mardin
Syriac writers
14th-century Oriental Orthodox archbishops
14th-century births
15th-century Oriental Orthodox archbishops
14th-century writers
15th-century writers